Sloggett is a surname. Notable people with the surname include:

Arthur Sloggett (1857–1929), British doctor and army officer
Nellie Sloggett (1851–1923), author and folklorist
Paul Sloggett (born 1950), Canadian abstract artist